Allomyces javanicus is a species of fungus from Indonesia.

External links 

 Mycobank entry

References

Aquatic fungi
Blastocladiomycota
Fungi described in 1929